David Lee Ta-wei (born 15 October 1949) is a Taiwanese politician and diplomat who is the chairman of Straits Exchange Foundation since 31 January 2023. He formerly served as the chairman of the Straits Exchange Foundation in 2020, the Secretary-General of the National Security Council of the Republic of China in 2018-2020, the Minister of Foreign Affairs from 20 May 2016 to 26 February 2018, and the Secretary-General to the President since 3 August 2020 to 31 January 2023.

Education 
 1986 PhD in Foreign Affairs, University of Virginia, USA 
 1980 M.A. in Foreign Affairs, University of Virginia 
 1973 B.A. in Political Science, National Taiwan University, ROC (Taiwan)

Career timeline

 2007–2012 representative, Taipei Economic and Cultural Office in Canada
 2004–2007 representative, Taipei Economic and Cultural Representative Office in the United States 
 2001–2004 representative, Taipei Representative Office in Belgium, also responsible for the European Union and Luxembourg
 1998–2001 deputy minister, Ministry of Foreign Affairs, ROC (Taiwan)
 2000–2001 adjunct professor, National Taiwan University
 1997–1998 director-general, Government Information Office, Executive Yuan, and Government Spokesman (Cabinet rank), ROC 
 1996 director-general, Department of North American Affairs, Ministry of Foreign Affairs, ROC 
 1993–1996 associate in Research, Fairbank Centre for East Asian Research, Harvard University
 1993–1996 director-general, Taipei Economic and Cultural Office in Boston
 1990–1993 deputy director-general, Department of International Information Service, Government Information Office, Executive Yuan
 1988–1993 adjunct associate professor, National Taiwan Normal University
 1988–1989 principal assistant to the Minister of Foreign Affairs
 1982–1988 staff consultant, Coordination Council for North American Affairs, Office in Washington, D.C.
 1976–1977 managing editor, Asia and the World Forum, Taipei, Taiwan

Minister of Foreign Affairs

Taiwan membership at the United Nations
Speaking in August 2016, Lee said that Taiwan will continue to pursue meaningful participation in the United Nations (UN) agencies. However, he will not promote Taiwan to apply for UN membership.

ROC diplomatic allies visits
During his ministerial term, Lee visited Palau to attend the inauguration of President Tommy Remengesau in January 2017, Haiti to attend the inauguration of President Jovenel Moïse in February 2017 and Solomon Islands in June 2017.

Secretary General to the President

Confidentiality breach on the Special Force soldier letter  
On 11 March 2022, a special force soldier wrote a letter to President Tsai Ing-wen reporting the insufficient basic logistic supply which has compelled the combatants to purchase from outsider suppliers at their own expense for two years, then being disqualified as non-standard upon inspection, in contrast of the reserve trainees receiving new sets; and appealed to abolish the mandatory diary writing for examination. The classified "2022006470" paper was taken photo illegally from the presidential palace and leaked to the media with his identity exposed on 18 March; hence Minister of National Defense Chiu Kuo-cheng reacted: "I will not let him get away with it", "Fix the crying baby!"; but later clarified while being questioned by the parliament members in the Legislative Yuan, that he just disgusts the coward behavior behind his back, and the critique unfair to the preparatory staff. The incident raised the broad society concern on the standard operating procedure practice on the data security breach in the presidential office.

Publications
 The Making of the Taiwan Relations Act: Twenty Years in Retropect. Oxford University Press, 2000 
 Taiwan in a Transformed World. (co-edited with Robert L. Pfaltzgraff, Jr.) Brassey's Inc., 1995 
 The Legislative Process of the Taiwan Relations Act. Taipei, Feng Yuen Publication, 1988

See also
List of foreign ministers in 2017

References 

1949 births
Living people
Taiwanese Ministers of Foreign Affairs
Kuomintang politicians in Taiwan
National Taiwan University alumni
Representatives of Taiwan to Belgium
Representatives of Taiwan to Canada
Representatives of Taiwan to the European Union
Representatives of Taiwan to the United States
Politicians of the Republic of China on Taiwan from Taipei